Phalaenoides is a genus of moths of the family Noctuidae. The genus was erected by John Lewin in 1805.

Species
 Phalaenoides glycinae Lewin, 1805 – Australian grapevine moth
 Phalaenoides tristifica (Hübner, 1818)

References

Agaristinae